Maryana may refer to:
 A given name typically for a woman found in Russian language, Ukrainian language, and Spanish language countries.
Maryana Marrash (1848–1919), Syrian poet
Maryana Naumova (born 1999), Russian powerlifter
Maryana Iskander an Egyptian-American social entrepreneur
 Maryana Dvorska a Ukrainian-American fitness model, actress, and social entrepreneur based in Los Angeles